Allenstown may refer to:
 Allenstown, New Hampshire, a town in the United States
 Allenstown, Queensland, a suburb in Rockhampton Region, Australia